Sangedevarkoppa is a village in Dharwad district of Karnataka, India.

Demographics 
At the 2011 Census of Indiam there were 200 households in Sangedevarkoppa and a population of 1,010 (523 males and 487 females). There were 147 children aged 0-6.

References

Villages in Dharwad district